This page details statistics of the FIBA European Champions Cup and EuroLeague.

General performances

By club

 Maccabi Elite Tel Aviv beat Panathinaikos in the 2000-01 FIBA SuproLeague final. The league did not contain all of the European champions.
 Kinder Bologna beat Tau Cerámica in the 2000–01 Euroleague final. The league did not contain all of the European champions.

By nation

By head coach

Players with the most championships

By city

Number of participating clubs of the EuroLeague Basketball era
The following is a list of clubs that have played or will be playing in the EuroLeague group stages, during the Euroleague Basketball era.

Clubs

By semi-final appearances (FIBA European Champions Cup and EuroLeague Basketball)

EuroLeague Final Four
The history of the EuroLeague Final Four system, which was permanently introduced in the 1987–88 season.

By season

Performance by club

References

External links
 EuroLeague Official Web Page
 InterBasket EuroLeague Basketball Forum
 TalkBasket EuroLeague Basketball Forum
 

 
Basketball